Maisières is a town of Wallonia and a district of the municipality of Mons, located in the province of Hainaut, Belgium.

It was a municipality until the fusion of the Belgian municipalities in 1977.

Sub-municipalities of Mons
Former municipalities of Hainaut (province)